Blessing Juspen (born 14 October 1989) is a Zimbabwean cricketer. He made his List A debut for Centrals cricket team 22 March 2007.

References

External links
 

1989 births
Living people
Zimbabwean cricketers
Centrals cricketers
Sportspeople from Kadoma, Zimbabwe